Jazz at the Maltings was a weekly series on BBC2 which featured some of the world's top jazz artists in concert at the Snape Maltings.

The series, produced by Terry Henebury and directed by Vernon Lawrence was first aired in autumn 1968. It was  introduced by jazz musician Benny Green. The show was completely missing from the archives until 2016. A total of five episodes are now known to exist, having been found by Ray Langstone.

Appearances

References

External links
 Getty Images, Jazz at the Maltings
 Jazz on film

Jazz events
BBC Television shows
20th century in jazz
1960s in music
1960s British music television series
1968 British television series debuts
1969 British television series endings
British jazz